The Basque Pelota World Championships is a quadrennial tournament first organized in 1952 by the International Federation of Basque Pelota. The modern championships crown the best amateur players in fifteen different playing categories.

History
The first edition of the tournament was organized in 1952 and until 1958 was played every three years. The tournament has occurred every four years since then. No third place titles were awarded during the first five editions of the tournament.
Additionally, the number of disciplines disputed at each tournament has varied depending on the edition and has even included disciplines played on the Plaza Libre in 1952 and 1958.
Until the edition of 1990, no women's categories were disputed in the championships. A single women's discipline was added in 1990 (Paleta goma - Trinquete), then another one in 1994 (Frontenis), and finally a third one in 2014 (Paleta goma - Fronton 30 m), bringing the total number of disputed categories to fifteen. Starting in 1995, the FIPV has also organized a Basque Pelota World Cup on each of the four categories of Basque pelota (Trinquete, Fronton 30m, Fronton 36m, Fronton 54m) which are also played quadrennially

Modern events

Editions

Nations finishing in top four

Medals (1952-2018)

List of hosts
List of hosts by number of championships hosted.

See also
Basque Pelota World Cup

References

World Championships
World championships
Recurring sporting events established in 1952
1952 establishments in Spain